Clover is a modern given name derived from the common name for the plant, which was ultimately derived from the Old English word clāfre.   The name has associations with Ireland and with good fortune due to traditional tales about the Irish shamrock or four-leaf clover.  The name has recently increased in usage, a trend that has been attributed to a renewed interest in “cottagecore names” with a vintage sensibility that are rooted in the natural world.
The name has ranked among the one thousand most used names for American newborn girls since 2021.

People
Clover Maitland (born 1972), Australian Olympian in women’s field hockey
Clover Moore (born 1945), Australian politician

See also
Clover (surname)

Notes

English feminine given names
Given names derived from plants or flowers